The Lewis Cup was an American soccer trophy established in 1914 as the championship trophy for the amateur Blue Mountain League, which was composed of clubs from the Lehigh Valley region of northeastern Pennsylvania.  It was later awarded to the winners of the American Soccer League's League Cup.  The last winner received the trophy in 1963 and it resides in the Museum of Sports Glory in Kiev, Ukraine.

History
In 1914, Horace Edgar Lewis donated a trophy to crown the champion of the newly established Blue Mountain League.  When the league disbanded, the trophy was stored in a jewelry store safe.  In December 1924, was brought out of storage in order to award to the winners of the 1925 American Soccer League cup.  The league began to collapse in 1931 and did not hold a league cup. In 1933, the league disbanded.  That year, a semi-professional league, the second American Soccer League, began operations.  In 1940, the Lewis Cup was again brought out of storage and given to the winners of the league cup.  In 1963, Newark Ukrainian Stich won the cup, the last season it was awarded.  The team later donated the trophy to the Museum of Sports Glory in Kiev.

Winners

Blue Mountain League

American Soccer League I

American Soccer League II

By club
#1941 known as Philadelphia German-American, 1943 as Philadelphia Americans

External links
 1925-1963 Results

References

Defunct soccer competitions in the United States
American Soccer League (1921–1933)
Soccer cup competitions in the United States
American Soccer League (1933–1983)